is a Japanese manga artist most known for his work on Freesia. Much of his manga is explicit in nature, frequently containing copious amounts of sex and violence.

Matsumoto's work Becchin & Mandara was released in English August 2011 as Velveteen & Mandala by North American publisher Vertical Inc. Other works by Matsumoto include Uncivilized Planet, Keep on Vibrating, Wendy, Avant-Pop Mars, Little Feet, A Revolutionist in the Afternoon and Tropical Citron

References

Manga artists from Tokyo
Living people
1970 births
People from Nerima